The 2005 Melbourne Storm season was the 8th in the club's history. They competed in the NRL's 2005 Telstra Premiership, finishing the regular season 6th out of 15 teams and making the finals. The season began with two big wins over the Knights and Dragons, each by more than 30 points. The form line followed a similar path to the previous season though as the team struggled to string consecutive wins together and hovered around the lower part of the eight for much of the season before ultimately finishing sixth once again. Future star Greg Inglis made his debut in Round 6. Storm finished the season with the second best defence in the competition and again went to Suncorp Stadium in Week One of the finals, producing the same result to defeat the Broncos. However for the third straight season the side was unable to progress past the semi final stage, losing to the Cowboys.  
At the end of the season, Storm legends Robbie Kearns and Matt Geyer were inducted as inaugural life members of the Club.

Season Summary
 22 February – The Supreme Court of New South Wales finds Melbourne and former players Stephen Kearney and Marcus Bai responsible for the spear tackle that ended the career of Jarrod McCracken in the 2000 NRL season.
 Round 1 – Melbourne open their 2005 season at home with a resounding 48-10 win over Newcastle Knights. Leading 22-0 at half time, the Storm extend their lead on the back of a Billy Slater hat-trick. Former Melbourne er Dustin Cooper scores a double for the visitors. Brett White makes his NRL debut.
 Round 4 – Storm thrash Brisbane Broncos 50-4 to inflict the heaviest defeat in the Broncos' 18-year history. The 50 point score against Brisbane also bested the 48 points scored by Melbourne in 1999. Before the game, the club honours 1999 premiership players Glenn Lazarus and Tawera Nikau; by renaming the eastern (Nikau) and western (Lazarus) grandstands.
 13 April – Melbourne is found to have breached the competition's salary cap in 2004 and are fined $120,000.
 Round 6 – Greg Inglis makes his NRL debut at just 18 years and 91 days, scoring a try.
 30 April – The Victoria State Government confirms that the Olympic Park precinct will undergo a $100m redevelopment, with a new stadium scheduled for completion in 2008.
 2 May – Controversy over "grapple tackles" erupts with Cronulla  claiming he was choked in a two-man Storm tackle.
 Round 12 – Melbourne breaks a three-game losing streak at home by beating St George Illawarra by 24–16.
 Round 13 – Melbourne win their first game at Leichhardt Oval since 1998, coming from 8-0 down at half time to win 30-14.
 Round 14 – Missing Origin players, Melbourne are awarded a controversial penalty try to Cooper Cronk early in the second half. It wasn't enough for the victory, as the New Zealand Warriors regained the Michael Moore Trophy win a 24-16 victory.
 Round 16 – Melbourne return to form thrashing South Sydney Rabbitohs 48-6, with Billy Slater scoring another hat-trick.
 Round 17 – Melbourne win just their second game in 13 attempts against 2004 premiers Canterbury-Bankstown Bulldogs, with Slater and Inglis both scoring two tries in a 33-6 win.
 Round 18 – In front of the lowest attended Olympic Park home game in club history (6,063), Melbourne hold Canberra Raiders scoreless for the first time.
 20 July – After weeks of speculation, it's announced  Matt Orford has signed a four-year contract with Manly worth nearly $2m.
 Round 23 – Melbourne celebrate the 100th game at Olympic Park by regaining the Michael Moore Trophy, winning 22-10 over the Warriors.
 Round 25 – In his last home game for the club, Robbie Kearns is chaired from the field following a 34-22 win over Wests Tigers. Coach Craig Bellamy saying that Kearns "without a doubt is the heart and soul of this club."
 Round 26 – A penalty try awarded against Billy Slater in a 30-24 loss to the North Queensland Cowboys was part of a controversial night in Townsville with Cowboys forward Carl Webb suspended for punching Ryan Hoffman allegedly in retaliation for a "grapple tackle." The loss drops Melbourne to sixth on the ladder at the end of the regular season, behind the Cowboys in fourth.
 Qualifying Final – Travelling to Brisbane for the second year in a row, Melbourne hang on for a 24-18 win over the Broncos. Injuries to Robbie Kearns (shoulder) and Billy Slater (ankle) complicating things for the club for the remainder of the finals.
 12 September – Melbourne and North Queensland spark a war of words over the "grapple tackle", with both clubs accusing the other of using the technique ahead of the semi final between the teams. Melbourne later release video of 20 incidents in which they claim Cowboys players were putting opponents in headlocks.
 Semi Final – For the third year in a row, Melbourne are eliminated in the second week of the NRL finals, this time going down 24-16 to the Cowboys at Aussie Stadium. Down 16-0 at half time, Melbourne were gifted a try by referee Paul Simpkins who failed to consult the video referee when  Steven Bell lost control of the ball while attempting to score. A frantic final flurry almost saw Melbourne level the scores led by fill-in captain Matt Orford.

Milestone games

Jerseys
For the 2005 season, Melbourne signed a new apparel contract with Reebok. The home jersey remained largely unchanged from the 2001-02 design, but now with a simple navy blue T-shirt style collar. This meant the home jersey did not feature gold for the first time in team history.

A new white clash jersey was designed, featuring a large gold thunderbolt with purple block shadowing, which was partially obscured by the jersey advertiser Adecco. The clash jersey was worn with different navy blue shorts featuring the thunderbolt design on the right.

The clash jersey was worn on seven occasions during the regular season (rounds 5, 13, 14, 19, 21, 22, 26); with Melbourne only winning on one occasion against Wests Tigers. Both finals games were also played with Melbourne wearing the clash jersey.

Fixtures

Pre Season

Regular season

Source:
(GP) - Golden Point extra time
(pen) - Penalty try

Finals

Ladder

2005 Coaching Staff
Head coach: Craig Bellamy
Assistant coaches : Dean Lance, Michael Maguire & Peter Sharp
Development coach: Marc Brentnall
Strength and conditioning Coach: Alex Corvo 
Football Manager: Peter O'Sullivan

2005 squad
List current as of 28 September 2021

Player movements

Losses
 Dustin Cooper to Newcastle Knights
 Rodney Howe to Retirement
 Stephen Kearney to Hull F.C.
 Ben MacDougall to Edinburgh Rugby
 Andrew McFadden to Retirement
 Fifita Moala to Released
 Kirk Reynoldson to Newcastle Knights
 Danny Williams to London Broncos

Gains
 Ian Donnelly from Manly Warringah Sea Eagles
 Jamie Feeney from Canterbury-Bankstown Bulldogs
 Jamie McDonald from North Queensland Cowboys
 Tevita Metuisela from Sydney Roosters
 Dennis Scott from Canterbury-Bankstown Bulldogs

Representative honours
This table lists all players who have played a representative match in 2005.

Statistics
This table contains playing statistics for all Melbourne Storm players to have played in the 2005 NRL season. 

Statistics sources:

Scorers

Most points in a game: 16 points
 Round 1 – Matt Orford (2 tries, 4 goals) vs Newcastle Knights
 Round 2 – Matt Orford (2 tries, 4 goals) vs St George Illawarra Dragons

Most tries in a game: 3 
 Round 1 – Billy Slater vs Newcastle Knights
 Round 16 – Billy Slater vs South Sydney Rabbitohs

Winning games

Highest score in a winning game: 50 points 
 Round 4 vs Brisbane Broncos

Lowest score in a winning game: 20 points
 Round 18 vs Canberra Raiders

Greatest winning margin: 46 points 
 Round 4 vs Brisbane Broncos

Greatest number of games won consecutively: 3
 Round 16 - Round 18

Losing games

Highest score in a losing game: 24 points
 Round 26 vs North Queensland Cowboys

Lowest score in a losing game: 10 points 
 Round 8 vs Cronulla-Sutherland Sharks

Greatest losing margin: 24 points
 Round 22 vs Cronulla-Sutherland Sharks

Greatest number of games lost consecutively: 2 
 Round 5 - Round 6
 Round 14 - Round 15
 Round 21 - Round 22

Feeder Teams
Under a new affiliation agreement, Melbourne split their reserve players between two feeder clubs during the 2005 season. The agreement with Norths Devils continued for an eighth season, with players who were dual-registered in Queensland travelling to Brisbane each week to play with in the Queensland Cup. Melbourne also formed an affiliation with foundation New South Wales Rugby League club North Sydney Bears for some players to play in the NSWRL Premier League.

In a repeat of the 2004 season, the Devils finished second on the ladder, but were bundled out of the finals in straight sets. 

Coached by Gary Freeman, the Bears finished tenth and missed the finals, with Alex Chan, Ian Donnelly, Jamie Feeney and Tevita Metuisela attracting praise from Freeman for their efforts.

Awards and honours

Melbourne Storm Awards Night
 Melbourne Storm Player of the Year: Cameron Smith 
 Best Back: Matt King
 Best Forward: Dallas Johnson
 Most Improved: Jake Webster
 Rookie of the Year: Brett White
 Try of the Year: Matt King
 Greg Brentnall Trophy (Coterie Award): Matt King
 Mick Moore Club Person of the Year: Julie Cliff
 Life Member Inductees: Robbie Kearns & Matt Geyer

Dally M Awards Night
Dally M Top Try Scorer (regular season only): Billy Slater 19 (with Shaun Berrigan)

Additional Awards
QRL Ron McAuliffe Medal: Cameron Smith
NSWRL Brad Fittler Medal: Matt King
Petero Civoniceva Medal: Greg Inglis

Notes

References

Melbourne Storm seasons
Melbourne Storm season